Ficus pertusa is a species of tree in the family Moraceae. It is found in Mexico and Central and South America.

Description
Trees up to 25 m tall. Leaves lanceolate, elliptic or ovate, with acuminate or acute apex. Figs edible, globose, 0.8-1.2 cm in diameter.

References

pertusa
Trees of Mexico
Flora of South America